The Hawthorne Hotel is a historic hotel located on Washington Square West in Salem, Massachusetts. The hotel is named after the novelist and Salem native Nathaniel Hawthorne. The hotel is currently a member of Historic Hotels of America, the official program of the National Trust for Historic Preservation. The U.S. News & World Report ranked it the number one hotel in Salem. It has also been listed as one of the top allegedly haunted places in Massachusetts.

History

Franklin Building 
Before the hotel’s construction, the location the hotel sits on used to be the site of the Franklin Building, built in the early 1800s. The building soon became the headquarters of the Salem Marine Society, acquired by sea captain Thomas Handasyd Perkins in 1838. It was damaged by fire twice mid-century, and in 1860 it was completely razed to the ground by flames. Between 1863 and 1864, the Marine Society ordered the reconstruction of the building.

Hotel 
By 1923, prominent members of the Salem community agreed that the city needed a modern hotel to house the increasing travelers for business. Frank Poor, founder of the Sylvania Lighting Company and North Shore native, was the most outspoken about ideas about the hotel. Construction of the hotel as it is today began in 1924, and on July 23 the following year the hotel was inaugurated and opened to the public.

In the 1950’s the hotel temporarily changed its changed its name to Hawthorne Motor Hotel due to the growing demand for cars.

It became a member of the Historic Hotels of America in 1991.

References 

Hotels in Massachusetts
Historic hotels in the United States
Hotels established in 1925
Buildings and structures in Salem, Massachusetts
Reportedly haunted locations in Massachusetts
Historic Hotels of America